A penumbral lunar eclipse took place on 18–19 October 2013, the last of three lunar eclipses in 2013.

Visibility 

It was visible from the Americas (for the end), Europe, Africa, and most of Asia (the beginning of the eclipse was visible in east Asia). The western part of the Philippines (including western Luzon and Palawan) could see the penumbral eclipse at moonset.

Photo

Related eclipses

Eclipses of 2013 
 A partial lunar eclipse on 25 April.
 An annular solar eclipse on 10 May.
 A penumbral lunar eclipse on 25 May.
 A penumbral lunar eclipse on 18 October.
 A hybrid solar eclipse on 3 November.

This eclipse is the one of four lunar eclipses in a short-lived series at the descending node of the moon's orbit.

The lunar year series repeats after 12 lunations or 354 days (Shifting back about 10 days in sequential years). Because of the date shift, the Earth's shadow will be about 11 degrees west in sequential events.

Half-Saros cycle
A lunar eclipse will be preceded and followed by solar eclipses by 9 years and 5.5 days (a half saros). This lunar eclipse is related to two partial solar eclipses of Solar Saros 124.

Tritos series 
 Preceded: Lunar eclipse of November 20, 2002
 Followed: Lunar eclipse of September 17, 2024

Tzolkinex 
 Preceded: Lunar eclipse of September 6, 2006
 Followed: Lunar eclipse of November 30, 2020

See also 
List of lunar eclipses and List of 21st-century lunar eclipses

References

External links
 
 Hermit eclipse: 23 Mar 2016 – Penumbral Lunar Eclipse
 Eclipse Geeks Penumbra Lunar Eclipse 18/19 October 2013

2013-10
2013 in science